Harry Rayment Miller (22 February 1907 – 1 September 1966) was an English cricketer.  Miller was a right-handed batsman who bowled right-arm medium pace.  He was born at Gravesend, Kent.

Miller made a single first-class appearance for Warwickshire against Worcestershire at Edgbaston in the 1928 County Championship.  Worcestershire made 312 in their first-innings, with Miller bowling 7 wicketless overs, while in response Warwickshire made 402/8 declared in their first-innings, with Miller scoring 8 runs before he was dismissed by Jack Bowles.  In their second-innings, Worcestershire scored 112/3, with Miller taking the wicket of Bernard Quaife with figures of 1/15 from 6 overs.

He died at Inverness, Inverness-shire, Scotland on 1 September 1966.

References

External links
Harry Miller at ESPNcricinfo
Harry Miller at CricketArchive

1907 births
1966 deaths
Sportspeople from Gravesend, Kent
English cricketers
Warwickshire cricketers